Marcello Diomedi (1 December 1942 – 25 September 2021) was an Italian professional footballer who played as a defender for Fiorentina, with whom he won the 1965–66 Coppa Italia and the 1966 Mitropa Cup, before later playing for Bari.

References

1942 births
2021 deaths
Italian footballers
Association football defenders
Serie A players
ACF Fiorentina players
S.S.C. Bari players